Ormocarpopsis nitida (common name sefontsohy) is a species of flowering plants in the legume family, Fabaceae. It belongs to the subfamily Faboideae. It is found only in Madagascar.

References

nitida